Francis Charles Moran (18 March 1887 – 14 December 1967) was an American boxer and film actor who fought twice for the Heavyweight Championship of the World, and appeared in over 135 movies in a 25-year film career.

Sports career

Born in Cleveland, Ohio, to Martin Moran and Mary Moran née McNally, immigrants from County Mayo, Ireland. Moran studied dentistry at the University of Pittsburgh where he also played football. He played professional football for the Pittsburgh Lyceums and Akron Pros as a guard and center.

While Moran was serving in the U.S. Navy in 1908, he knocked out fighter Fred Cooley in the second round. While serving on the U.S.S. Mayflower, he served as a spar partner for President Theodore Roosevelt. He began his career as a prize-fighter that same year with a match against Fred Broad.  Soon, Moran, who had a hard right hand punch which he called "Mary Ann", became known as the "White Hope" of the teens.  In 1914 he fought Jack Johnson for the Heavyweight Championship of the World, and in 1916 "The Fighting Dentist" went up against Jess Willard for the same title, but lost both bouts.  He lost his last fight to Marcel Nilles for the Heavyweight Championship of France on December 22, 1922.  He retired from boxing after 66 bouts with a record of 36 wins (28 by a knockout), 13 losses, 16 draws and 1 no contest.

Frank Moran was inducted into the Pennsylvania Boxing Hall of Fame in 2012.

Film career
After acting in one show on Broadway in 1926 – a stage adaptation of Theodore Dreiser's novel An American Tragedy – Moran made his film debut in 1928 when he did two silent films, The Chinatown Mystery and Ships of the Night, but his film career didn't start in earnest until 1933, when he appeared as himself in The Prizefighter and the Lady, and also in Mae West's She Done Him Wrong, in which he played a convict.  This was typical of the kinds of roles Moran was to play for the next 25 years – gangsters, henchmen, "plug uglies", bartenders, stage hands, sailors, guards, cops, bouncers, moving men, sergeants and other soldiers – roles which belied his personal gentleness and sensitivity.

In the 1940s, Moran was part of Preston Sturges' unofficial "stock company" of character actors, appearing in every American film written and directed by Sturges with one exception. He was seen in The Great McGinty, Christmas in July, The Lady Eve, Sullivan's Travels, The Palm Beach Story, The Miracle of Morgan's Creek, Hail the Conquering Hero, The Great Moment, The Sin of Harold Diddlebock and Unfaithfully Yours.  It was Moran who, as a cop in Sturges' Christmas in July (1940), halted a tirade by an argumentative Jewish storeowner by barking, "Who do ya think you are, Hitler?" And it was Moran who, as a tough chauffeur in Sullivan's Travels (1942), patiently explains to his traveling companions the meaning of the word "paraphrase."

Moran was usually credited for his performances, but almost never received star or featured billing.  One exception was Monogram Pictures's Return of the Ape Man (1944), starring Bela Lugosi and John Carradine, in which Moran shared credit for the title role with George Zucco, although, in fact, Zucco became ill and Moran replaced him – Zucco does not appear in the film as released. Also, at the beginning of his acting career, Moran was part of the featured cast in Raoul Walsh's Sailor's Luck (1933).

Other notable films in which Moran appeared include Charlie Chaplin's Modern Times 1936, Fred Astaire and Ginger Rogers's Follow the Fleet, Shall We Dance, and Carefree (1938), Frank Capra's Meet John Doe (1941), 1943's Lady of Burlesque starring Barbara Stanwyck and Road to Utopia with Bob Hope and Bing Crosby (1946).

Moran's final film appearance was an uncredited bit part in The Iron Sheriff, a Western, in 1957 at the age of 70.  He was 80 when he died in Hollywood, California on 14 December 1967 of a heart attack.

Selected filmography

References

External links
Frank Moran at Cyber Boxing Zone

1887 births
1967 deaths
Male actors from Pennsylvania
Akron Pros players
Boxers from Ohio
American male film actors
Players of American football from Pennsylvania
Sportspeople from Pennsylvania
American people of Irish descent
20th-century American male actors
American male boxers
Heavyweight boxers